Isoteinon abjecta, the abject hopper, is a species of butterfly in the family Hesperiidae. It is found in Senegal, the Gambia, Guinea, Sierra Leone, Liberia, Ivory Coast, Ghana, Togo, Nigeria, Cameroon, the Republic of the Congo, Angola, the Democratic Republic of the Congo (Mayoumbe) and Zambia. The habitat consists of forests and humid Guinea savanna.

References

Butterflies described in 1872
Astictopterini
Butterflies of Africa
Taxa named by Pieter Cornelius Tobias Snellen